Local elections were held in Taiwan on 27 November 2010 to elect mayors, councillors, and village chiefs of special-municipalities (Kaohsiung, New Taipei, Taichung, Tainan and Taipei), known as the Five Municipalities Elections. Mayoral candidates for the Kuomintang were elected in New Taipei, Taipei, and Taichung, while candidates for the Democratic Progressive Party were elected in Kaohsiung and Tainan. On the eve of the election, Sean Lien, son of former Vice President Chan Lien, was shot in face when he was campaigning for a Kuomintang New Taipei councillor candidate.

Earlier in the year on 12 June 2010, elections were held to elect representatives in township/city councils and village chiefs.

Results summary

Taipei

Electoral background

As the capital of Taiwan, Taipei functions as the economic and political centre of Taiwan, and is currently the largest city of Taiwan. Due to the great allocation of resources to Taipei, the Municipal Mayoral position of Taipei is of extreme strategic importance within the political arena, and has always been a fiercely contested position. Because two directly elected Municipal Mayors of Taipei, Chen Shui-bian and Ma Ying-jeou, were elected the Presidents in 2000 and 2008 respectively, the position has been widely speculated to be a "first-step" towards the Presidential Office.

Having been under the administration of the Kuomintang for the past twelve years, Taipei is commonly considered to be solidly in the Pan-Blue political camp. Recent estimates show that approximately 60% of voters who identify themselves with political inclination support the Pan-Blue Coalition, whilst 40% support the Pan-Green Coalition. A significant proportion of eligible voters in Taiwan identify themselves as having no political inclination. The incumbent Taipei Municipal Mayor Hau Lung-pin of the Kuomintang stood for his second term in this election.

Polling

Predictions

Results

Municipal Mayoral Election

Municipal Councilmen Election

Ward Chiefs Election

New Taipei

Electoral background

New Taipei (formerly Taipei County) was promoted into a central municipality, and replaced Taipei City as the largest city of Taiwan. Taipei County was under the administration of the Kuomintang, with the incumbent Taipei County Magistrate Chou Hsi-wei serving as mayor. However, unlike Taipei City, which is solidly in the Pan-Blue political camp, the electoral composition of Taipei County is more evenly distributed between Pan-Blue and Pan-Green Coalition supporters, with only a very slight overall inclination towards the Pan-Blue political camp. It should also be noted that Taipei County had previously been under the administration of the Democratic Progressive Party for 16 years, until the incumbent County Magistrate Chou Hsi-wei won power 5 years ago.

Polling

Predictions

Results

Municipal Mayoral Election

Municipal Councilmen Election

Ward Chiefs Election

Taichung

Electoral background

The newly created central municipality Taichung will be formed from the merging and elevation of Taichung County and Taichung City, both of which are currently county-level divisions of Taiwan. At present, both Taichung County and Taichung are under the administration of the Kuomintang, with the incumbent Taichung County Magistrate being Huang Chung-sheng and the incumbent Taichung City Mayor being Jason Hu Chih-chiang. The electoral composition of Taichung County is relatively balanced with only a slight overall inclination towards the Pan-Blue political camp, whereas Taichung City is commonly considered to be mildly leaning towards the Pan-Blue political camp. It is estimated that in Taichung County, approximately 52% of voters who identify themselves with political inclination support the Pan-Blue Coalition, whilst 48% support the Pan-Green Coalition. In Taichung City, the proportion of Pan-Blue to Pan-Green supporters within voters who identify themselves with political inclination is approximately 55% to 45%.

Polling

Predictions

Results

Municipal Mayoral Election

Municipal Councilmen Election

Ward Chiefs Election

Tainan

Electoral background

The newly created central municipality Tainan will be formed from the merging and elevation of Tainan County and Tainan City, both of which are currently county-level divisions of Taiwan. The incumbent Tainan County Magistrate Su Huan-chih and the incumbent Tainan City Mayor being Hsu Tain-tsair are both members of the Democratic Progressive Party. Having been under the administration of the Democratic Progressive Party for the past seventeen and thirteen years respectively, both Tainan County and Tainan City are commonly considered to be strongholds of the Pan-Green political camp. It is estimated that in both the county and the city, approximately 60% of voters who identify themselves with political inclination support the Pan-Green Coalition, whilst 40% support the Pan-Blue Coalition.

Polling

Predictions

Results

Municipal Mayoral Election

Municipal Councilmen Election

Ward Chiefs Election

Kaohsiung

Electoral background

The newly created central municipality Kaohsiung will be formed from the merging of Kaohsiung County and the current central municipality Kaohsiung City. The incumbent Kaohsiung Municipal Mayor Chen Chu and the incumbent Kaohsiung County Magistrate Yang Chiu-hsing are both members of the Democratic Progressive Party. Having been under the administration of the Democratic Progressive Party for the past twelve years, the electoral composition of Kaohsiung City has a slight overall inclination towards the Pan-Green political camp. On the other hand, Kaohsiung County has been under the control of Tangwai members and the Democratic Progressive Party for 25 years, is widely considered to be solidly in the Pan-Green political camp. It is estimated that in Kaohsiung County, approximately 60% of voters who identify themselves with political inclination support the Pan-Green Coalition, whilst 40% support the Pan-Blue Coalition.

Polling

Predictions

Results

Municipal Mayoral Election

Municipal Councilmen Election

Ward Chiefs Election

Implications and reactions

A forum entitled "Policy Direction after Five Metropolitan Elections in Taiwan", organized by the Institute for National Policy Research on Monday, November 29, 2010, concluded that although the Kuomintang won three of the five mayoral positions, in terms of the overall votes won, the real victor was in fact the Democratic Progressive Party.

Raymond Burghardt, chairman of the American Institute in Taiwan, said that the way both parties handled the shooting which wounded Sean Lien, son of former vice-president Lien Chan, "was also a sign of political maturity."

Taiwanese political scientist Hsu Yung-ming believed that the elections signalled the era of the new "Four Heavenly Kings"  Tsai Ing-wen, Chen Chu, William Lai and Su Jia-chyuan within the Democratic Progressive Party.

See also
 Elections in the Republic of China

Notes

References

2010 Taiwanese local elections
2010 Taiwanese local elections